The men's 1000 metres competition at the 2022 European Speed Skating Championships was held on 7 January 2022.

Results
The race was started at 20:42.

References

Men's 1000 metres